The Legal Services Act 2007 is an Act of the Parliament of the United Kingdom that seeks to liberalise and regulate the market for legal services in England and Wales, to encourage more competition and to provide a new route for consumer complaints. It also makes provisions about the Legal Profession and Legal Aid (Scotland) Act 2007.

Regulatory objectives
Section 1 of the Act defines eight regulatory objectives:
Protecting and promoting the public interest;
Supporting the constitutional principle of the rule of law;
Improving access to justice;
Protecting and promoting the interests of consumers of legal services;
Promoting competition in the provision of legal services;
Encouraging an independent, strong, diverse and effective legal profession;
Increasing public understanding of the citizen's legal rights and duties;
Promoting and maintaining adherence to the professional principles;

The professional principles are:
Authorised persons should act with independence and integrity;
Authorised persons should maintain proper standards of work;
Authorised persons should act in the best interests of their clients;
Persons who exercise before any court a right of audience, or conduct litigation in relation to proceedings in any court, by virtue of being authorised persons should comply with their duty to the court to act with independence in the interests of justice, and
Affairs of clients should be kept confidential.

The Legal Services Board
Sections 2 to 7 and Schedule 1 create the Legal Services Board with a duty to promote the regulatory objectives. David Edmonds was appointed the first chair of the Board on 23 April 2008 and nine members were appointed on 17 July. The members took up post on 1 September 2008 and the Board became fully operational on 1 January 2010.

The Act also created a Consumer Panel to represent consumers (ss. 8–11) which started work on 1 November 2009. The Panel is independent of the Legal Services Board and consists of eight lay members whose appointments are approved by the Lord Chancellor. The Panel provides advice to the Board and publishes policy briefings, consultation responses, and research reports.

Reserved legal activities
Section 12 and Schedule 2 define six reserved legal activities:
Exercise of rights of audience;
Conduct of litigation;
Reserved instrument activities, being certain activities concerning land registration and real property;
Probate activities;
Notarial activities;
Administration of oaths.

This list can be amended by an Order in Council of the Chancellor (ss. 24–26).

Section 12 then goes on to define, for the purposes of the Act, a legal activity as either a reserved legal activity or as the provision of legal advice, assistance or representation in connection with the application of the law or with any form of resolution of legal disputes. Legal activity does not include acting as a mediator or arbitrator.

Only an authorised person or an exempt person can carry out a reserved legal activity (s. 14). It is a crime to carry out a reserved activity otherwise though it is a defence that the person "did not know, and could not reasonably have been expected to know" that they were committing an offence. It is also an offence to pretend to be authorised (s. 17) An offender can be sentenced on summary conviction to up to six months' imprisonment and a fine of up to £5,000. If convicted on indictment in the Crown Court an offender can be sentenced to up to two years' imprisonment and an unlimited fine. An unauthorised person who purports to exercise a right of audience also commits a contempt of court for which he can be punished.

These provisions came into force on 1 January 2010.

Authorised persons and approved regulators
Authorised persons are either (s. 18):
Persons authorised in respect of a given legal activity by a relevant approved regulator; or
Licensed bodies authorised in respect of those activities.

Relevant approved regulators are (s. 20/ Sch. 4, Pt. 1):

The Legal Services Board does not have the power to recommend to the Lord Chancellor that he approve further approved regulators (s. 20/ Sch. 4, Pt. 2). The regulatory arrangements of all the approved regulators defined in Sch. 4, Pt. 1 remain in place at the coming into force of the Act but thereafter, all changes to internal professional regulatory arrangements must be approved by the Board (s. 20/ Sch. 3, Pt. 3).  The Institute of Chartered Accountants in England and Wales was added as an approved regulator on 6 April 2020.

Regulation of approved regulators
Approved regulators have a duty to promote the regulatory objectives (s. 28). If they fail to do so, or if they fail in some other way to comply with the Act, the Legal Services Board can:
Issue directions to the regulator to correct the deficiency (ss. 32-34/ Sch. 7);
Publish a public censure (ss. 35–36);
Impose a financial penalty (ss. 37–40);
Make an intervention direction whereby the regulatory function is performed by a person nominated by the Board (ss. 41–44);
Recommend that the Lord Chancellor cancel the regulator's approval (ss. 45–48).

The Board has a duty to regulate practising fees (s. 51), resolve regulatory conflicts (ss. 52–54), and work with the Office of Fair Trading, the Competition Commission and the Lord Chancellor on competition issues (ss. 57–61). These provisions came into force on 1 January 2009 and 1 January 2010.

, no date is fixed for the coming into force of these provisions.

Alternative business structures and licensed bodies
Before the coming into force of the Act, lawyers in England and Wales could only practice as:
Solicitors, as sole traders or in partnerships with other solicitors;
Barristers, as sole traders; or
Employees providing legal services to their employer.

The Act allows alternative business structures (ABSs) with non-lawyers in professional, management or ownership roles. The Act creates a system whereby approved regulators can authorise licensed bodies to offer reserved legal services (ss.71–111).

The Solicitors Regulation Authority licensed the first set of ABSs in 2012, including Cooperative Legal Services.

Complaints
Approved regulators must operate a complaints system as part of their internal regulatory arrangements (s. 112). Section 114 of the Act creates an Office for Legal Complaints which the section 115 stipulates must administer an ombudsman scheme (ss. 114–158 /Sch. 15). Section 114 came into force on 7 March 2008. 

On 3 February 2009, the Legal Services Board announced the board members for the Office for Legal Complaints and the Office officially launched on 24 July 2009. The new scheme was the Legal Ombudsman, which has exclusive first instance jurisdiction for complaints regarding legal professionals. The Legal Ombudsman began receiving complaints on 6 October 2010.

This scheme replaced the Legal Services Complaints Commissioner and Legal Services Ombudsman, which had been established in the Courts and Legal Services Act 1990 (s. 159). The Office of the Legal Services Complaints Commissioner closed on 31 March 2010. The Office of the Legal Services Ombudsman closed in 2011.

For the purposes of complaints only, claims management services are regarded as reserved legal activities and the Claims Management Services Regulator as an approved regulator (s. 161).

Legal professional privilege
The Act extends legal professional privilege to authorised persons other than barristers and solicitors (s. 190). This section came into force in 2010.

Costs in pro bono proceedings
Where a litigant is represented in civil proceedings on a pro bono basis, it would be contrary to the indemnity principle to award costs to that person. Section 194 allows the court to order a payment to a charity in lieu. These provisions came into force progressively from 30 June to 1 October 2008.

References

Bibliography

United Kingdom Acts of Parliament 2007
Acts of the Parliament of the United Kingdom concerning England and Wales
Legal ethics
Acts of the Parliament of the United Kingdom concerning legal services